This is a list of bridges and tunnels on the National Register of Historic Places in the U.S. state of Tennessee.

References

 
Tennessee
Bridges
Bridges